Vermont State University (VSU) is a public university in the state of Vermont formed through the merger of three institutions: Castleton University, Northern Vermont University, and Vermont Technical College. The university was first proposed in December 2020 as a way to consolidate the Vermont State Colleges, the state's public university system. It is accredited by the New England Commission of Higher Education.

Beginning July 1, 2023, Vermont State University will operate residential campuses in five communities: Castleton, Johnson, Lyndon, Randolph, and Williston. In addition, it will operate nine smaller learning sites around the state and three out-of-state in Alaska, New Hampshire, and Wisconsin.

History 
Castleton University was chartered as grammar school in 1787, making it the oldest predecessor institution to Vermont State University. Johnson Academy was founded in 1828, later becoming Johnson State College; Vermont Technical College was founded in 1866 as Orange County Grammar School; Lyndon State College was founded in 1911 as a normal school. The Vermont General Assembly created the Vermont State Colleges in 1961, creating a "loose confederation" of colleges that also included the Community College of Vermont after its founding in 1970 (but never included the University of Vermont). Beginning in 1977, the Vermont State Colleges adopted a more centralized model, with its trustees overseeing the operations of all its constituent schools. This began to reverse somewhat beginning in 2000, when the system allowed more autonomy for the schools while still encouraging cooperation, including uniform course numbering so students could take courses from different VSC institutions.

By 2020, however, the Vermont State Colleges were in poor financial shape. That year, Vermont State Colleges Chancellor Jeb Spaulding proposed closing Northern Vermont University, closing Vermont Technical College's Randolph campus, and laying off almost 500 employees. Even with the proposal, Spaulding told trustees, the system needed an immediate infusion of $25million to keep operating. Spaulding withdrew the proposal amid fierce opposition and the state appropriated additional funds to keep all campuses and colleges operating, but lawmakers asked VSC to come up with a way to fix its financial situation. VSC formed a committee, named the Select Committee on the Future of Public Higher Education, which ultimately recommended a similar proposal to Spaulding's closure plan. Instead of closing campuses, however, the committee recommended merging all three of the system's four-year colleges into a single institution with multiple campuses. While the committee did not recommend including the Community College of Vermont in the merger, it did recommend it focus more toward workforce education and adult learning. The proposal was projected to save the system $25million over five years.

The combined institution will include the roughly 5,500 students at its three predecessor institutions; however, the 250 academic programs offered between the three schools will shrink to 100.

Academics 
Vermont State University will offer associate, bachelor's, and master's degrees. The Castleton, Johnson, and Lyndon campuses offer liberal arts education while the Randolph and Williston locations house the Vermont State Institute of Technology. Students will have the option to take online courses as well as hybrid courses from other campuses.

Athletics 
Owing to the university's unique composition from a series of formerly independent colleges, four of its five campuses will have their own athletics programs. Students will be able to participate in athletics based on their campus, with some of the campuses competing against each other in athletic conferences.

 Castleton Spartans (NCAA Division III)
 Johnson Badgers (NCAA Division III)
 Lyndon Hornets (NCAA Division III)
 Randolph Knights (USCAA)
Starting in the 2024-25 academic year, athletics at the Johnson campus will become sanctioned by the USCAA, and athletics at the Randolph campus will move to a club-only model.

Campuses

Castleton 

The 165-acre Castleton campus has been in its current location since 1818. The Castleton Medical College Building, built this year, is the oldest building on campus and is believed to be the oldest surviving medical school building in the United States. The campus is residential and is located in the heart of Castleton Village.

Johnson 
The Johnson campus is located on a hill overlooking the Lamoille River valley. It is 350 acres and includes several buildings including the Visual Arts Center and Dibden Center for the Arts. The Babcock Nature Preserve, located ten miles away, is a 1,000 acre forest owned and maintained by the college for scientific and educational study.

Lyndon 

The Lyndon campus is notable for the three-story Samuel Read Hall Library. Other sites on campus include News 7, a daily live broadcast studio; the Stannard Gymnasium; and nine residence halls. The Lyndon campus is one of only two institutions of higher education in Vermont's Northeast Kingdom.

Randolph 
The Vermont State Institute of Technology's main campus in Randolph is the largest of the five at 544 acres and hosts engineering labs and an advanced manufacturing center. The campus has received United States Department of Defense funding to establish the first advanced manufacturing education, research, and development facility in the state.

Williston 
The suburban Williston campus of the Vermont State Institute of Technology, located just outside Burlington, houses several labs and a small residential building.

References 

2023 establishments in the United States
Education in Vermont